A towed pinger locator is a water-borne device used to locate the sonar "ping" from the underwater locator beacon which is fitted to the Cockpit Voice Recorders and Flight Data Recorders installed in commercial airliners. They can locate pingers at depths of up to  underwater. 

The locator is mounted in a hydrodynamic shell, or "tow fish", connected by winch behind a surface vessel across the search area. The locator listens for the sound emanating from the beacon or "pinger". Once located, the beacon and its attached recorders can be retrieved by divers, submersibles or remotely operated vehicle (ROV), depending on depth.

Most beacons transmit a pulse once a second at 37.5 kHz. 

The hydrophone must be positioned below the thermocline layer which reflects sounds, either back to the surface or back to the ocean floor. Since the pinger signal is relatively weak, the hydrophone must be within a nautical mile (about ) to detect it.

See also 

 Flight recorder
 Emergency position-indicating radiobeacon station (ELTs)
 Air France Flight 447 
 Korean Air Lines Flight 007
 List of unrecovered flight recorders
 Malaysia Airlines Flight 370
 Towed array sonar

References 

Aircraft emergency systems
Beacons